Hector William Powell Lingwood-Smith (22 May 1900 – 19 October 1972) was an Australian rules footballer who played with Collingwood in the Victorian Football League (VFL).

He also played and coached in Tasmania during the 1920s, being with Lefroy in 1924 and New Town in 1925.

Lingwood-Smith represented the TFL versus a South Australian combined side in Adelaide in 1925.

Notes

External links 
		
Hector Lingwood-Smith's profile at Collingwood Forever

1900 births
1972 deaths
Australian rules footballers from South Australia
Collingwood Football Club players
Sturt Football Club players
Lefroy Football Club players
South Adelaide Football Club players
Richmond Football Club administrators
Australian military personnel of World War I
Australian Army personnel of World War II
Australian Army soldiers
Military personnel from South Australia